The National Alliance for Progress is a political party in Guinea. In the parliamentary election held on 30 June 2002, the party won 2% of the popular vote and 2 out of 114 seats.

References

Political parties in Guinea